Bernadine Maxwell (died May 31, 1988) was an All-American Girls Professional Baseball League player. She was born in Topeka, Kansas.

According to All American League data, Bernadine Maxwell played in the league in its 1948 season. Additional information is incomplete because there are no records available at the time of the request.

In 1988 was inaugurated a permanent display at the Baseball Hall of Fame and Museum in Cooperstown, New York that honors those who were part of the All-American Girls Professional Baseball League. Bernadine Maxwell, along with the rest of the girls and the league staff, is included at the display/exhibit.

Sources

1988 deaths
All-American Girls Professional Baseball League players
Baseball players from Kansas
People from Topeka, Kansas
Date of birth missing
Place of death missing
Year of birth missing